Kvitnu is a Ukrainian label of electronic music.

History 

Ukrainian label run by Dmytro Fedorenko (Kotra), started at the end of year 2006, with the aim to amplify the electronic experimental outputs from the land of Ukraine and to discover new musical variations from the outer world. Kvitnu concentrates on music and ideas with a high blood pressure in its sound-veins, which are carefully bodied in very specially-created natural cardboard flesh, mainly designed by Zavoloka.

Along with releases activity, Kvitnu acts as an organizing structure, searching and bringing out new names in Ukrainian experimental scene, by making regular live-events, festivals and presentations in different cities and venues. The brightest examples of our producing activity are Kvitnu Fest and international Detali Zvuku festival. But together with festivals Kvitnu runs series of smaller events called Kvitnu_live and MicroFormat, where we already invited Scorn, Pan Sonic, Extrawelt, Alexei Borisov, and many other artists.

In 2011 Kvitnu became a winner in three nominations of the Qwartz Electronic Music Awards 7 in Paris - as The Best label, The Best Artist (Sturqen) and Discovery Category (Peste by Sturqen). Also v4w.enko was nominated in Discovery category with his work “Harmonic Ratio”.
In 2013, Vitor Joaquim and Dunaewsky69 are respectively nominated for those categories : Experimentation with the album "Filament" et Best Album/EP with the EP "Termination Voice".

External links 

 

Ukrainian record labels